Flatiron Mountain, at  above sea level is a peak in the Lemhi Range of Idaho. The peak is located in Lemhi County on the border of Caribou-Targhee National Forest and Salmon-Challis National Forest.

References 

Caribou-Targhee National Forest
Mountains of Lemhi County, Idaho
Mountains of Idaho
Salmon-Challis National Forest